Seán Barrett (born 4 May 1940) is an English actor.

Career

Television and film appearances
Barrett began his career as a child actor, appearing on BBC children's television and in films such as Bang! You're dead, A Cry from the Streets, War and Peace, The Genie and Four Sided Triangle.

Years later he made many appearances in television and films including ITV Television Playhouse, Z-Cars, The Wednesday Play, Cast a Giant Shadow, Emergency-Ward 10, Chronicle, Armchair Theatre, Hell Boats, Moonstrike, Attack on the Iron Coast, Softly, Softly, The Terrorists, Robin Hood Junior, BBC Play of the Month, The Zoo Robbery, Paul of Tarsus, Tales of the Unexpected, Father Ted, Holby City, Brush Strokes, Minder, Poldark, Noah's Ark and Theatre 625.

Voice actor and narrator
In the mid-1970s Barrett was cast in the BBC Radio series of George Simenon's Inspector Maigret novels as Maigret's subordinate, Inspector Janvier. He has performed the voices of Asterix, Caius Tiddlius, Fulliautomatix, Roman Ghost, Cylindric, Mannikinpix, Gladiator Trainer and Jailer in the English version of The Twelve Tasks of Asterix, Tik-Tok in Return to Oz, a Goblin in Labyrinth, Big Mac and other characters in TUGS, Thadius Vent's soothsayer Goodtooth in Oscar's Orchestra, Melchoir in the English dubbed version of the Lapitch the Little Shoemaker TV series, Roly the Pineapple in the English version of The Fruities and UrSu the Dying Master and UrZah the Ritual-Guardian in The Dark Crystal as well as additional characters in two video games The Feeble Files and Viking: Battle for Asgard. He also provided the voice for Captain Orion in Star Fleet, the English version of the 1980s Japanese puppet series X-Bomber.

He also narrated Fair Ground!, Timewatch, People's Century and Dark Towers for BBC, dubbed voices in many anime films such as Roujin Z, Cyber City Oedo 808 and Dominion: Tank Police and has done voices for several audiobooks and radio stations.

In 1996, he was the narrator for the Channel 4 documentary series, Black Box. The series primarily concentrated on commercial aviation accidents, and the investigations related to them.

Barrett also worked as part of an ADR Loop Group on Aardman's first computer-animated film Flushed Away, a voice director on Lapitch the Little Shoemaker and a dialogue director on The Fruities. He has also narrated episodes of the BBC TV series People's Century and Dancing in the Street, as well as a number of BBC nature documentaries in the late 1990s and early 2000s.

In 2011, he voiced Andre of Astora, Petrus of Thorolund and Ingward in Dark Souls. He returned to voice Darkdiver Grandahl in Dark Souls II, and later reprised his role as Andre of Astora in Dark Souls III, as well as voicing Holy Knight Hodrick. In 2017, he voiced the Titan Azurda in Xenoblade Chronicles 2 and in 2018, reprised the role for Xenoblade Chronicles 2: Torna – The Golden Country.

Record sleeve
In 1985 the rock band The Smiths used a still of Barrett as a teenager in the 1958 film Dunkirk for the sleeve of their hit single How Soon Is Now?

Filmography

Film
Four Sided Triangle (1953) - Young Robin
The Genie (1953) -
Game of Danger (1954) - Willy
Escapade (1955) - Warren
War and Peace (1956) - Petya Rostov
Dunkirk (1958) - Frankie
A Cry from the Streets (1958) - Don
Sink the Bismarck! (1960) - Able Seaman Brown
Sons and Lovers (1960) - Arthur Morel
Cast a Giant Shadow (1966) - Junior British Officer
Attack on the Iron Coast (1968) - Radio Man (uncredited)
Great Catherine (1968) - Andrei Strelkin (uncredited)
Hell Boats (1970) - Sub. Lt. Hendrickson, R.N.V.R.
The Zoo Robbery (1973) - Watson
Robin Hood Junior (1975) - Sergeant
The Dark Crystal (1982) - UrSu the Dying Master, UrZah the Ritual-Guardian (voices)
Return to Oz (1985) - Tik-Tok (voice)
Labyrinth (1986) - Goblin (voice)
Beneath Still Waters (2005) - Additional voices (English and Spanish dub)
Renaissance (2006) - Naghib (voice)

Television
The Twelfth Brother (1952) - Benjamin
The Man in Armour (1952) - Ian Rowland 
Stranger in the House (1953) - Peter Benfield
Thames Tug (1953) - Jimmy Spurgeon
BBC Sunday-Night Theatre (1953–1956) - Richard Miller, Jimmy Sheelan
Rheingold Theatre (1953–1956) - Tony Belfont, Timothy Mulligan, Brian
The Coelacanth (1957) - Nicko
Johnnie's Night Out (1954) - Johnnie O'Hanlon
The Secret Way (1954) - John
The Scarlet Eagle (1954) - Captain Giles
The Adventures of the Big Man (1956) - Tom Lomas
Flash (1956) - Joe Harvey
Sword of Freedom (1958) - Brunetto
The Mad O'Haras (1958) - Desmond Burke
ITV Play of the Week (1959) - Ordinary seaman Frank Conway, Paul Legrand
The Flying Doctor (1959) - Malcolm Parker
Armchair Theatre (1959–1962) - Ralph, Clifford Ross
Emergency-Ward 10 (1960) - Martin Cole
Paul of Tarsus (1960) - Timothy
The Terrorists (1961) - 2nd Lt. Adams
ITV Television Playhouse (1962) - Arthur
Z Cars (1962–1965) - Ashworth, Alan Guest, Arthur Carron
BBC Sunday-Night Play (1963) - Michael
Drama 61-67 (1963) - Mark
Moonstrike (1963) - Paul de Montlucon
The Sullavan Brothers (1964) - Tony
Redcap (1964) - Private Kierney
Theatre 625 (1964–1968) - Albino, Capt. Dakers
The Flying Swan (1965) - John Grafton
The Wednesday Play (1966) - Gus
Softly, Softly (1967) - Jamie Gosse
Look and Read (1967) - Will Kent
Thirty-Minute Theatre (1967–1971) - Danny, Mike
Mighty Jack (1968) - Father, Interrogator (voices, English)
BBC Play of the Month (1972) - Temple
2nd House (1974) - Steven in Grace
The Unbroken Arrow (1976) - 
Tales of the Unexpected (1981) - Hijack
Look and Read: Dark Towers (1981) - Narrator
Star Fleet (1982) - Captain Orion (voice)
Look and Read: Through The Dragon's Eye (1989) - Gorwen the Dragon (voice)
TUGS (1989) - Big Mac, Hercules, Captain Zero, Zebedee, Izzy Gomez, Fire Chief, Sea Rogue, and Blair (voices)
Father Ted (1996) - Father Fitzgerald

Animation
The Twelve Tasks of Asterix (1976) - Asterix, Caius Tiddlius, Fulliautomatix, Roman Ghost, Cylindric, Mannikinpix, Gladiator Trainer, Jailer
Asterix and the Big Fight (1989) - Additional voices
The Fruities (1990) - Roly
Oscar's Orchestra (1994) - Goodtooth
Lapitch the Little Shoemaker (2000) - Melchoir (voice)
Spheriks (2002) - Additional voices
Azur & Asmar: The Princes' Quest (2006) - Le Sage Yadoa
A Fox's Tale (2008) - Doc

Anime
Secret of Mamo (1978) - Koichi Zenigata (1996 Manga UK dub)
Goodbye Lady Liberty (1989) - Koichi Zenigata
The Heroic Legend of Arslan (1991) - Silver Mask
Cyber City Oedo 808 (1990) - Gogul (Gabimaru Rikiya)
Roujin Z (1991) - 1st Ache
Tokyo Babylon (1992) - Inspector Kono
Dominion: Tank Police (1992) - Lt Britain
New Dominion Tank Police (1993) - Lt Britain

Video games
The Feeble Files (1998) - Additional voices
Viking: Battle for Asgard (2008) - Additional voices
Dark Souls (2011) - Andre of Astora, Petrus of Thorolund, Ingward
Dark Souls II (2014) - Darkdiver Grandahl
Risen 3: Titan Lords (2014) - Additional voices
Dark Souls III (2016) - Holy Knight Hodrik, Blacksmith Andre
Total War: Warhammer (2016) - The Advisor
Total War: Warhammer II (2017) - The Advisor
Xenoblade Chronicles 2 (2017) - Azurda / Gramps
Xenoblade Chronicles 2: Torna ~ The Golden Country (2018) - Azurda
Super Smash Bros. Ultimate (2018) - Azurda
Total War: Warhammer III  (2022) - The Advisor

Audiobooks
 His Dark Materials – Lord Asriel/ Iorek Byrnison
 Bleak House by Charles Dickens – One of two narrators with Teresa Gallagher
 Terrorism and Communism: A Reply to Karl Kautsky by Leon Trotsky – Narrator
 The Holy Qur'an translated by Wahiduddin Khan – Narrator
 Muhammad: His Life Based on the Earliest Sources by Martin Lings – Narrator
 The Redeemer by Jo Nesbø – Narrator
 The Snowman by Jo Nesbø – Narrator
 The Leopard by Jo Nesbø – Narrator
 The Bat by Jo Nesbø – Narrator
 Police by Jo Nesbø – Narrator
 Perfume by Patrick Suskind – Narrator
 The Left Hand of God by Paul Hoffman – Narrator
 Of Human Bondage by W. Somerset Maugham -Narrator
 A Passion for Killing by Barbara Nadel - Narrator
 Molloy by Samuel Beckett - Narrator
 Malone Dies by Samuel Beckett - Narrator
 The Unnamable by Samuel Beckett - Narrator
 Lennox by Craig Russell - Narrator
 The Long Glasgow Kiss by Craig Russell - Narrator
 The Deep Dark Sleep by Craig Russell - Narrator
 Dead Men and Broken Hearts by Craig Russell - Narrator
 Berlin: The Downfall 1945 by Antony Beevor - Narrator
 The Battle for Spain by Antony Beevor - Narrator
 Secret Warriors by Taylor Downing - Narrator
 Toward the Flame by Dominic Lieven - Narrator 
 Young Stalin by Simon Sebag Montefiore - Narrator
 Watching you by  Michael Robotham- Narrator
 The Age of Iron Trilogy by Angus Watson - Narrator
 Harlequin by Bernard Cornwell - Narrator
 Ardennes 1944: Hitler's Last Gamble by Antony Beevor - Narrator
 Close your eyes by Michael Robotham - Narrator
 West of West Trilogy by Angus Watson- Narrator
Slow Horses (Slough House Book 1) by Mick Herron - Narrator
Dead Lions (Slough House Book 2) by Mick Herron - Narrator
The List (A Slough House Novella, Book 2.5) by Mick Herron - Narrator
Real Tigers (Slough House Book 3) by Mick Herron - Narrator
Spook Street (Slough House Book 4) by Mick Herron - Narrator
London Rules (Slough House Book 5) by Mick Herron - Narrator
The Drop (A Slough House Novella, Book 5.5) by  Mick Herron - Narrator
Joe Country (Slough House Book 6) by Mick Herron - Narrator
The Catch (A Slough House Novella, Book 6.5) by Mick Herron - Narrator
Slough House (Slough House Book 7) by Mick Herron - Narrator

References

External links

Sean Barrett at naxosaudiobooks
 Sean Barrett at Audible

1940 births
Living people
Audiobook narrators
English male child actors
English male television actors
English male film actors
English male voice actors
People from Hampstead
English voice directors